Uchku (Quechua for hole, pit, also spelled Uchco) is mountain in the Cordillera Central in the Andes of Peru which reaches a height of approximately   high. It is located in the Lima Region, Yauyos Province,  Laraos District. Uchku lies southwest of a lake named Pumaqucha. The entrance to Sima Pumaqucha, one of the deepest caves of South America, is on the southern slope of the mountain.

Gallery

References 

Mountains of Lima Region
Mountains of Peru